Jungle Junction is a CGI interactive computer-animated children's television series created by Trevor Ricketts. In the United States, it was originally part of the Playhouse Disney daily block intended for preschoolers. On 14 February 2011, it was moved to the Disney Junior block, serving as Playhouse Disney's replacement. A second season of 27 episodes was ordered by Disney, and premiered on 2 April 2011. A total of 47 episodes were produced. The show focuses on a group of animalistic vehicles and their adventures.

It aired on Disney Junior in the United States and in the Netherlands, as well as in the United Kingdom and Ireland, Portugal, Spain, Turkey and in most of Asia. It was produced in the UK by animation company Spider Eye Productions.

Episodes

Christmas special 
A Christmas special called "The Night Before Zipsmas" aired 5 December 2009 showing the wheelers getting ready for Christmas and trying to get to read the book "The Night Before Zipsmas". The other Christmas special was called "A Gift for Zooter" and aired the same day. It shows Ellyvan trying to find a gift for Zooter.

Characters

Main 
Zooter (voiced by Janet James) is the series' protagonist. She is a pink pig whose name is a compound of "zoo" or "zip" and "scooter". Zooter speaks with a British accent and is the jungle messenger. She also says the title in every episode.
Ellyvan (voiced by Billy West) is a blue elephant van, who carries the deliveries around the jungle. He is the biggest animal in the jungle and Zooter's best friend. His name is a compound word, albeit fictitious. He is able to suck improbable quantities of liquids up his trunk and spray them distances of up to half a mile or more. He speaks with an American accent.
Bungo (voiced by Keith Wickham) is a yellow bunny with brown ears, who loves to make signs and put them all over the jungle. He is very good at Geography, and knows the jungle better than anyone. He is also the only wheeler that is good at jumping, being able to leap many times his own height into the air. Bungo, despite officially being a bunny, has a long, raccoon-like tail with brown stripes as well.  During the credits at the end of every episode in Season 1, he zooms up with signs and asks the viewers for help finding the right sign. He speaks with a British accent.

Recurring 
Taxicrab (voiced by Jess Harnell) is a red crab that loves to dance and makes the greatest smoothies in the jungle. His name derives from a taxi cab, and he is the only wheeler that is able to drive sideways (possibly because of the "sideways walk", attributed to crabs). Despite the fact that Toadhog is often impatient, Taxicrab tolerates him the most. He speaks with a Jamaican accent.
Carla (voiced by Laraine Newman) is an orange koala who owns a grocery shop. She appears in Season 1, but rarely does in Season 2.
Crocker (voiced by Keith Wickham) is a green crocodile, and a fire chief with a lisp who wears a yellow helmet with a red flashing light on top. He has some skill at gardening and knows how to make compost. His name comes from the phrase which is slang in the United Kingdom, used to describe many second hand cars.
Hippobus (voiced by Amanda Symonds) is a yellow hippopotamus and school bus, who usually carries The Beetlebugs to school. Her name derives from a Hippie Bus – usually a redecorated Volkswagen Bus. She speaks with a Jamaican accent.
The Beetlebugs are the junior wheelers. Their name and shape derives from a Volkswagen Beetle – cars that were nicknamed bugs. Their speech is mostly synchronized. There are five of them - a blue one, a red one, a green one, a yellow one and an orange one.
Lance (voiced by Dee Bradley Baker) is a purple rhinoceros and an ambulance. His name is both a contraction of ambulance, and likely a reference to a weapon used by lancers who attacked with it at a full charge – much like a rhino attacks things by charging at them.
Bobby (voiced by Jimmy Hibbert) is a toucan and a police chief. His character may be derived from a Bubble car – he even has the same three-wheeled chassis. His name is derived from the British slang word for police officers. He is the only Wheeler that can fly.
Dozer (voiced by Keith Wickham) is a bull and a construction worker. His name and shape derive from a bulldozer, being a pun. His talent is digging and repairing roads with his dozer blade.
Miss Jolly (voiced by Amanda Symonds) is a zebra and a school teacher. She is one of the oldest and wisest of the Wheelers. She is also the only one to wear glasses.
Toadhog (voiced by Ron Orbach) is a grumpy green toad who likes worms and Fifi flies. He has a long, sticky tongue that can shoot out a long way to grab things. His name derives from the term "roadhog" – an inconsiderate or selfish motorist. He seems to be responsible for Jungle Junction's power supply – his water wheel powers the generator for all of the lights (including the traffic lights, in "Hiccup Power"), and he has a supplementary generator that is used to power the Zipsmas lights. He loses his patience with almost everyone except Taxicrab, mostly because Taxicrab is the most tolerant of him.

Side 
 Bingo is a sign who is Bungo's pretend friend.
 Diamond (voiced by Kerry Shale) is Bobby's cousin.
 Elkabungo (voiced by Keith Wickam) is a superhero. He is an alternative version of Bungo. Elkabungo is a super bunny.
 Ellysanta (voiced by Keith Wickham) is blue.
 Ellyvan's mum and dad are red and green. They first met at the "The Strip Tree" everything after this is unknown sence soon after Ellyvan was born they both left to get milk
 Emmavan (voiced by Emily Blunt) is a purple elephant who is the younger sister of Ellyvan.
 Evelyn (voiced by Teresa Gallagher) is a pink elephant who is Ellyvan's girlfriend and the new wheeler in the jungle.
 Flagogo (voiced by Maria Darlin) is a pink flamingo.
 Hippie Bus (voiced by Keith Wickham) is Hippobus's older brother. He is a blue hippopotamus.
 The Hyena Triplets are Three Hyena Cars who are Troublemakers in Jungle Junction. They like to laugh at things that are Not Funny, (Example, Thomas telling Henry his cars aren't present). They are voiced by Rebecca Shoicet, Kuchi Brasso, and Kerry Shale.
 Kellyvan (voiced by Josh DiMaggio) is Ellyvan's daredevil friend and a flying orange elephant. He likes Ellyvan and Zooter and all the characters in Daredevil Ellyvan.
 Kris Kringle (voiced by Michael Caine) is a man who delivers presents.
 Orangy
 Prickly is a green cactus.
 Princess Sofia Pink Bird
 Pumpkin is a new 6th Beetlebug in Jungle Junction.
 Rosie is a purple beetlebug.

Broadcast 
The series aired in the United Kingdom, Ireland, United States, Portugal, Latin America, Spain, Sri Lanka, Canada, Poland, Netherlands, Japan, Turkey and Russia.

References

External links 
 Jungle Junction Official Site
 Jungle Junction at Disney.co.uk
 Jungle Junction at Disney.es
 

2000s American animated television series
2010s American animated television series
2000s American children's comedy television series
2010s American children's comedy television series
2009 American television series debuts
2012 American television series endings
2000s British animated television series
2010s British animated television series
2000s British children's television series
2010s British children's television series
2009 British television series debuts
2012 British television series endings
American children's animated adventure television series
American children's animated comedy television series
American children's animated fantasy television series
American computer-animated television series
American preschool education television series
British children's animated adventure television series
British children's animated comedy television series
British children's animated fantasy television series
British computer-animated television series
British preschool education television series
Animated preschool education television series
2000s preschool education television series
2010s preschool education television series
English-language television shows
Disney Junior original programming
Television series by Disney
Animated television series about pigs
Animated television series about elephants
Animated television series about rabbits and hares
Disney animated television series
Jungles in fiction